Elections to Liverpool Town Council were held on Wednesday 1 November 1838. One third of the council seats were up for election, the term of office of each councillor being three years.

There was a by-election in the Castle Street ward.

Five of the seventeen seats were uncontested.

The terms "Whig" and "Reformer" are used interchangeably, although the local press at the time referred exclusively to "Reformers".

After the election, the composition of the council was:

Election result

Ward results

* - Retiring Councillor seeking re-election

Abercromby

Castle Street

Everton

Exchange

Great George

Lime Street

North Toxteth

Pitt Street

Rodney Street

{{Election box candidate with party link|
  |party      = Whigs (British political party)
  |candidate  = Thomas Harvey
  |votes      = ''274  |percentage = 51%  |change     = 
}}

St. Anne Street

St. Paul's

St. Peter's

Scotland

South Toxteth

Vauxhall

West Derby

Aldermanic Elections

On 9 November 1838, the term of office of eight of the sixteen aldermen expired.

The following were elected as Aldermen until 9 November 1844.*''' - re-elected Alderman.

See also

 Liverpool City Council
 Liverpool Town Council elections 1835 - 1879
 Liverpool City Council elections 1880–present
 Mayors and Lord Mayors of Liverpool 1207 to present
 History of local government in England

References

1838
1838 English local elections
November 1838 events
1830s in Liverpool